Maja Riniker (born 23 Mai 1978 Aarau, Switzerland) is a Swiss politician of the Liberals (FDP) and a member of the National Council the lower house of the Swiss Parliament.

Early life and education 
She was born in Aarau in and grew up in Lenzburg where she attended primary and high school. Her father was Ruedi Baumann, an architect, municipal politician and commander of a panzer-battalion. She then trained as a merchant at the Swiss Bank Corporation in Aarau accompanied by a graduation with a Matura.  Following she worked for banks in Zürich before in 2003 she returned to Aarau. In Aarau she worked in the administration of her husbands medical clinic. In 2020, she resigned from the office.

Political career 
Maja Riniker held her first speech in the National Council, in 1995, then as a member of the Scouts. Riniker was elected into the school commission of Suhr with twenty-seven years of age. After eight years she resigned, when her first child entered school. Since about 2009 she was a co-president of the cantonal women's branch of the FDP for 10 years. She is currently an honorary member of the women's branch. Riniker entered into the Gand Council of Aargau in 2014, as the successor of Beat Rüetschi. In the grand Council, she was the president of the Public Security Commission for three years. In 2017, Riniker was considered a candidate to the municipality of Suhr, but she declined.

Member of the National Council 
She run both in 2011 and 2015 as a candidate for the National Council, but was not elected. In November 2018, Riniker was nominated a candidate for the National Council for Aargau by the Suhr branch of the FDP. In the National council she took a seat in the Security Commission. In September 2022, she was nominated as the second vicepresidency of the National Council by the FDP, to which the party was entitled. In November 2022, she was elected, which would mean Riniker would assume the presidency of the National Council in 2025, if Riniker would be reelected in 2023.

Political positions 
She supports a stronger military and also the purchase of a new fighter jet. In December 2021 she supported the establishment of a Cybercommando in the Swiss army. In December 2021, after she became aware that the Swiss army was called to assist in the vaccination during the COVID-19 pandemic, she demanded that other options such as the Swiss Civilian Service shall be evaluated before. In September 2020, she was elected the president of the Federation of the Swiss Civilian Service (SZSV).

Personal life 
She is married with a medic and journalist Florian Riniker and has three children. She has three places of origin in Aargau, Villigen, Habsburg and Lenzburg. She separates municipal politics from family life and left the local school commission in which she was active for eight years until her first child entered school. Also the candidacy for the presidency of the municipality of Suhr she declined for the same reason.

References 

1978 births
FDP.The Liberals politicians
21st-century Swiss women politicians
People from Aarau
Members of the National Council (Switzerland)
Living people